Lorca Massine is a choreographer and dancer born in New York on July 25, 1944, to Russian émigré parents. His father, Léonide Massine, was also a notable choreographer and dancer of the 20th Century. Lorca studied dance with Yves Brieux, Victor Gsovsky, Asaf Messerer and Anatole Wilzac.

Over his career, Lorca Massine has collaborated with the world-acclaimed choreographers such as Balanchine, Béjart, and his father, Léonide.

Repertoire 
Multiple internationally renowned companies include Massine's works in their repertoires, such as the Birmingham Royal Ballet, New York City Ballet, American Ballet Theater, Béjart's Ballet of the Twentieth Century and the Paris Opera Ballet, among others. His works have also been performed on the stages of the greatest opera houses, such as the Metropolitan Opera (New York), Teatro alla Scala (Milan), Teatro la Fenice (Venice), Teatro San Carlo (Naples), Teatro dell'Opera (Rome), Teatro Massimo (Palermo), Teatro Carlo San Felice (Genoa), the Royal Opera House at Covent Garden (London), and the Arena di Verona.

Zorba 
Like his father, he presents contemporary themes in dance based on the classical background. His interest in this field has resulted in creating multiple story ballets. Massine has created more than fifty ballet choreographies and musical works. The original version of Zorba, which gained worldwide recognition, has been seen in around forty countries by over three million thrilled spectators. The première of Zorba at the Arena of Verona in 1988 turned out to be a breakthrough in Massine's career.

“In ballet, simplified dramaturgical elements allow direct human experience to emerge and captivate the hearts of audiences over and over.” – excerpt of critical article on Zorba in Ahram Online

Directorships
 Director, Ballet of Opera of Rome, 1981-1983
 Director, Ballet of the Polish National Opera (Warsaw), 1992-1994

Lorca Massine and his father's heritage 
Lorca Massine is also known for setting his father's choreographic works on contemporary stages. He has staged Léonide Massine works for the Paris Opera, the Birmingham Royal Ballet, American Ballet Theater, the Pennsylvania Ballet, Les Grands Ballets Canadiens, the Royal Winnipeg Ballet, Bavarian State Ballet, the Boston Ballet and Vienna State Ballet. In 2005, three ballets of Léonide Massine became part of the repertoire of the Bolshoi Ballet.

As the reviver of his father ballets, he staged the following works:
 Choreartium
 Gaieté Parisienne
 La Boutique Fantasque
 La Symphonie Fantastique
 Laudes Evangelii (12th century music orchestrated by V. Buchi)
 Les Presages
 The Rite of Spring
 The Picasso Ballets: Le Tricorne, Mercure, Parade and Pulcinella

Works

Lorca Massine's Full-length Ballets
 Ondine (Henze/La Motte Fouquet)
 Mario and the Magician (Thomas Mann/Visconti/Manino)
 Esotérik Satie (Erik Satie, piano music)
 Fortepianissimo (F. Chopin)
 Streets (the Musical)
 La metamorphose (Franz Kafka; Berlioz)
 Zorba (Kazantzakis/Theodorakis)
 Undine (Hans Werner Henze)
 Fortepianissimo (F. Chopin)

One-Act Ballet
 Four Last Songs (Richard Strauss)
 Sebastian (Giancarlo Menotti)
 The Rite of Spring (Claude Debussy)
 The song of the Nightingale (Andersen/Depero/Stravinsky)
 La colonie penitentiaire (Kafka, Mayuzumi)
 Ode (Igor Stravinsky)
 10th Symphony (Gustav Mahler)
 Mercure (Satie, Picasso)
 Jack in the box (Derain, Milhaud)
 Fantaisie Serieuse (Erik Satie)

References 

1944 births
Living people
American male ballet dancers
American choreographers
People from New York City
American people of Russian descent
Ballets by Lorca Massine